The Battle of Byzantium (Byzantion) was a battle in the wars of the successors of Alexander the Great (see Diadochi) between the generals Antigonus Monopthalmus and Cleitus the White. It was a two-day-battle fought near Byzantium at the Hellespont in 317 BC and resulted in a stunning Antigonid victory.

Background
After the death of Alexander the Great in 323 BC, his generals immediately began squabbling over his huge empire. Soon the squabbling degenerated into open warfare, with each general attempting to claim a portion of Alexander's vast Empire. One of the most talented successor generals (Diadochi) was Antigonus Monophthalmus, so called because of an eye he lost in a siege. After the First War of the Diadochi in 321 BC, the second partition of the Empire took place, the Partition of Triparadisus; Antipater became the new regent of the empire and Antigonus strategos of Asia (charged him with hunting down and defeating the remnants of the Perdiccan faction). Antigonus took command of the Royal Army and after being reinforced with more reliable troops from Antipater's European army he marched against their enemies in Asia Minor. In 319 BC he first marched into Cappadocia against Eumenes whom he defeated at the Battle of Orkynia. Eumenes escaped to the fortress of Nora where Antigonus invested him. Leaving the siege of Nora to a subordinate Antigonus marched against the remaining Perdiccans and defeated them at the Battle of Cretopolis. Antigonus's coalition partner, Antipater, died of old age (83 years old) that year and left the regency to Polyperchon. Antigonus did not accept Polyperchon authority and formed a coalition with Cassander, Ptolemy and Lysimachus against the coalition of the new regent. In 318 BC, Antigonus drove Cleitus the White, the satrap of Lydia, out of his satrapy. Cleitus fled to Polyperchon who equipped him with a large fleet and sent him to take command of the Hellespont at the beginning of the summer of 317 BC.

Prelude
Antigonus had spent the autumn and winter of 318 BC in western Asia Minor consolidating his position and gathering a fleet. He now sent Nicanor with a fleet of 100–130 ships to do battle against Cleitus in the Hellespont while he himself marched there with an army. Cleitus was in the Hellespont with a slightly larger fleet.

The Battles
The two fleets met in battle near Byzantium, Cleitus won a victory in which some 70 ships of Nicanor were captured, sunk or disabled, the remnant managing to escape to Chalcedon, where they were joined by Antigonus and his army. Antigonus ordered the remaining 60 ships to be readied for renewed action, and assigned his strongest and most loyal soldiers as marines to these ships. Meanwhile, the Byzantines transported his archers, slingers and peltast to the European shore, where Cleitus's victorious forces were encamped. At dawn the next day Antigonos launched an assault by land and sea and caught Cleitus completely by surprise; Cleitus’s entire force was captured or killed.

Aftermath
Cleitus managed to escape with a single ship, but he was soon forced to run it aground and tried to reach Macedon by land. He was intercepted and executed by some soldiers working for Lysimachus . This brilliant stroke greatly enhanced Antigonus's reputation for military genius (he had won three stunning victories in a row) and freed him from further worry of Polyperchon interfering in Asia. He at once set out to deal with Eumenes who was causing trouble in Cilicia, Syria and Phoenicia.

References

317 BC
Byzantium
Byzantium 317 BC
Antigonus I Monophthalmus